The 1963 Mexican Grand Prix was a Formula One motor race held at the Ciudad Deportiva Magdalena Mixhuca in Mexico City on October 27, 1963. It was race 9 of 10 in both the 1963 World Championship of Drivers and the 1963 International Cup for Formula One Manufacturers.

Jim Clark dominated the race from pole position, a time that was 1.7 seconds faster than anybody else. Mexico was considered one of his most successful venues. His fastest lap of the race eclipsed his pole time by 0.7 seconds, and he lapped the entire field except for second and third behind him. He eventually scored a total of five pole positions, four fastest laps and three victories at the venue in his Formula One career. This was also his sixth win, his sixth fastest lap, and his sixth pole position of the nine races completed in 1963.

This was also the only World Championship Grand Prix where a car raced with the number 13 until Pastor Maldonado selected the number as his permanent race number in 2014.

Classification

Qualifying

Race

 Surtees was disqualified for a push-start.

Championship standings after the race

Drivers' Championship standings

Constructors' Championship standings

 Notes: Only the top five positions are included for both sets of standings. Only the best 6 results counted towards the Championship. Numbers without parentheses are Championship points; numbers in parentheses are total points scored.

References

Mexican Grand Prix
Mexican Grand Prix
1963 in Mexican motorsport
October 1963 sports events in Mexico